St. Moritz railway station is a railway station in the resort town of St. Moritz, in the Swiss canton of Graubünden. It is the southern terminus of the Albula Railway line from Chur, and a northern terminus for the Bernina Railway line from Tirano in Italy. The station also serves as a terminus for local bus and Postbus services.

Hourly services operate on both the Albula and Bernina lines. Because these two lines operate with different types and levels of power supply, St Moritz is also a "Power supply switch" station (Systemwechselbahnhof).

History
The station came into operation in 1904.   At this time St Moritz had already had its own electric tram service, since 1896 and there were plans to build a branch line to link the tram service to the new station. For financial reasons the short linking branch line was never built, however.

Services
The following services stop at St. Moritz:

 Glacier Express: Several round-trips per day to Zermatt.
 Regio:
 limited service to Chur.

Gallery

References

External links
 
 
 

Railway stations in Graubünden
Rhaetian Railway stations
St. Moritz
Railway stations in Switzerland opened in 1904